The 2015–16 Milwaukee Bucks season was the 48th season of the franchise in the National Basketball Association (NBA). On December 12, 2015, the team ended the Golden State Warriors’ 28-game winning streak including their NBA record-setting 24–0 start. 

As of 2023, this represents the most recent losing season for the Bucks.

Draft picks

Roster

Game log

Preseason

|- style="background:#fbb;"
| 1
| October 6
| @ Chicago
| 
| Rashad Vaughn (20)
| Damien Inglis (9)
| Jorge Gutiérrez (7)
| United Center21,199
| 0–1
|- style="background:#fbb;"
| 2
| October 10
| Detroit
| 
| Greg Monroe (18)
| Greg Monroe (8)
| Gutiérrez, Vásquez (3)
| BMO Harris Bradley Center7,350
| 0–2
|- style="background:#bfb;"
| 3
| October 13
| @ Cleveland
| 
| Monroe & Vaughn (19)
| Greg Monroe (13)
| O. J. Mayo (10)
| Quicken Loans Arena18,624
| 1–2
|- style="background:#fbb;"
| 4
| October 17
| Washington
| 
| Khris Middleton (21)
| John Henson (13)
| Vásquez, Mayo, Carter-Williams (5)
| BMO Harris Bradley Center4,716
| 1–3
|- style="background:#bfb;"
| 5
| October 20
| Minnesota
| 
| Khris Middleton (17)
| Greg Monroe (12)
| Vásquez, Carter-Williams (5)
| Kohl Center12,381
| 2–3
|- style="background:#fbb;"
| 6
| October 23
| @ Minnesota
| 
| Giannis Antetokounmpo (23)
| Giannis Antetokounmpo (7)
| Jerryd Bayless (4)
| Target Center10,101
| 2–4

Regular season game log

|- style="background:#fbb;"
| 1
| October 28
| New York
| 
| Greg Monroe (22)
| Greg Monroe (14)
| Greivis Vásquez (5)
| BMO Harris Bradley Center18,717
| 0–1
|-style="background:#fbb;"
| 2
| October 30
| Washington
| 
| Giannis Antetokounmpo (27)
| Giannis Antetokounmpo (9)
| Michael Carter-Williams (11)
| BMO Harris Bradley Center13,858
| 0–2

|-style="background:#fbb;"
| 3
| November 1
| @ Toronto
| 
| Giannis Antetokounmpo (20)
| Giannis Antetokounmpo (9)
| Michael Carter-Williams (7)
| Air Canada Centre19,800
| 0–3
|-style="background:#bfb;"
| 4
| November 2
| @ Brooklyn
| 
| Jerryd Bayless (26)
| Greg Monroe (13)
| Michael Carter-Williams (5)
| Barclays Center12,576
| 1–3
|- style="background:#bfb;"
| 5
| November 4
| Philadelphia
| 
| Khris Middleton (21)
| Greg Monroe (8)
| Greivis Vásquez (5)
| BMO Harris Bradley Center12,437
| 2–3
|- style="background:#bfb;"
| 6
| November 6
| @ New York
| 
| Giannis Antetokounmpo (20)
| Antetokounmpo, Monroe (7)
| Greivis Vásquez (5)
| Madison Square Garden19,812
| 3–3
|- style="background:#bfb;"
| 7
| November 7
| Brooklyn
| 
| Greg Monroe (20)
| Khris Middleton (9)
| Jerryd Bayless (10)
| BMO Harris Bradley Center15,228
| 4–3
|- style="background:#fbb;"
| 8
| November 10
| Boston
| 
| Greg Monroe (17)
| Greg Monroe (14)
| Greg Monroe (4)
| BMO Harris Bradley Center11,822
| 4–4
|- style="background:#fbb;"
| 9
| November 11
| @ Denver
| 
| Jerryd Bayless (22)
| Greg Monroe (10)
| Greivis Vásquez (9)
| Pepsi Center9,403
| 4–5
|- style="background:#bfb;"
| 10
| November 14
| Cleveland
| 
| Bayless, Carter-Williams (17)
| Greg Monroe (17)
| Jerryd Bayless (5)
| BMO Harris Bradley Center18,717
| 5–5
|- style="background:#fbb;"
| 11
| November 17
| @ Washington
| 
| Khris Middleton (14)
| Bayless, Henson (6)
| Giannis Antetokounmpo (7)
| Verizon Center15,485
| 5–6
|- style="background:#fbb;"
| 12
| November 19
| @ Cleveland
| 
| Giannis Antetokounmpo (33)
| Greg Monroe (8)
| Vásquez, Carter-Williams (5)
| Quicken Loans Arena20,562
| 5–7
|- style="background:#fbb;"
| 13
| November 21
| @ Indiana
| 
| Greg Monroe (10)
| Greg Monroe (14)
| Monroe, Carter-Williams, Vásquez (3)
| Bankers Life Fieldhouse17,137
| 5–8
|- style="background:#bfb;"
| 14
| November 23
| Detroit
| 
| Greg Monroe (20)
| Greg Monroe (13)
| Michael Carter-Williams (8)
| BMO Harris Bradley Center 12,319
| 6–8
|- style="background:#fbb;"
| 15
| November 25
| Sacramento
| 
| Antetokounmpo, Middleton (21)
| John Henson (11)
| Greivis Vásquez (7)
| BMO Harris Bradley Center14,120
| 6–9
|- style="background:#fbb;"
| 16
| November 27
| @ Orlando
| 
| Antetokounmpo, Bayless (17)
| Greg Monroe (8)
| Mayo, Middleton (4)
| Amway Center16,317
| 6–10
|-style="background:#fbb;"
| 17
| November 29
| @ Charlotte
| 
| Khris Middleton (19)
| Greg Monroe (10)
| Bayless, Middleton (6)
| Time Warner Cable Arena14,224
| 6–11
|- style="background:#bfb;"
| 18
| November 30
| Denver
| 
| Greg Monroe (18)
| John Henson (7)
| Michael Carter-Williams (9)
| BMO Harris Bradley Center10,187
| 7–11

|-style="background:#fbb;"
| 19
| December 2
| @ San Antonio
| 
| Khris Middleton (19)
| Monroe, Parker (7)
| Michael Carter-Williams (4)
| AT&T Center18,418
| 7–12
|-style="background:#fbb;"
| 20
| December 4
| @ Detroit
| 
| Khris Middleton (21)
| Greg Monroe (13)
| Bayless, Carter-Williams (5)
| The Palace of Auburn Hills16,963
| 7–13
|- style="background:#bfb;"
| 21
| December 5
| New York
| 
| Michael Carter-Williams (20)
| Greg Monroe (14)
| Giannis Antetokounmpo (6)
| BMO Harris Bradley Center16,223
| 8–13
|- style="background:#bfb;"
| 22
| December 7
| Portland
| 
| Giannis Antetokounmpo (17)
| Greg Monroe (12)
| Michael Carter-Williams (7)
| BMO Harris Bradley Center14,389
| 9–13
|- style="background:#fbb;"
| 23
| December 9
| L. A. Clippers
| 
| Michael Carter-Williams (20)
| Greg Monroe (10)
| Michael Carter-Williams (11)
| BMO Harris Bradley Center14,224
| 9–14
|- style="background:#fbb;"
| 24
| December 11
| @ Toronto
| 
| Khris Middleton (26)
| Middleton, Monroe (7)
| Michael Carter-Williams (6)
| Air Canada Centre19,800
| 9–15
|- style="background:#bfb;"
| 25
| December 12
| Golden State
| 
| Greg Monroe (28)
| Giannis Antetokounmpo (12)
| Giannis Antetokounmpo (10)
| BMO Harris Bradley Center18,717
| 10–15
|- style="background:#fbb;"
| 26
| December 15
| @ L. A. Lakers
| 
| Michael Carter-Williams (19)
| Miles Plumlee (8)
| Antetokounmpo, Carter-Williams (5)
| Staples Center18,997
| 10–16
|- style="background:#fbb;"
| 27
| December 16
| @ L. A. Clippers
| 
| Mayo, Carter-Williams (17)
| Giannis Antetokounmpo (11)
| Mayo, Middleton (6)
| Staples Center19,060
| 10–17
|- style="background:#fbb;"
| 28
| December 18
| @ Golden State
| 
| Michael Carter-Williams (24)
| Greg Monroe (13)
| Greg Monroe (7)
| Oracle Arena19,596
| 10–18
|- style="background:#bfb;"
| 29
| December 20
| @ Phoenix
| 
| Michael Carter-Williams (20)
| Michael Carter-Williams (9)
| Khris Middleton (7)
| Talking Stick Resort Arena16,859
| 11–18
|- style="background:#bfb;"
| 30
| December 23
| Philadelphia
| 
| Giannis Antetokounmpo (22)
| Greg Monroe (6)
| Michael Carter-Williams (9)
| BMO Harris Bradley Center15,754
| 12–18
|- style="background:#fbb;"
| 31
| December 26
| Toronto
| 
| Khris Middleton (20)
| Greg Monroe (11)
| Khris Middleton (7)
| BMO Harris Bradley Center16,329
| 12–19
|-style="background:#fbb;"
| 32
| December 28
| @ Dallas
| 
| Jerryd Bayless (19)
| Greg Monroe (11)
| Jerryd Bayless (7)
| American Airlines Center20,300
| 12–20
|- style="background:#fbb;"
| 33
| December 29
| @ Oklahoma City
| 
| Khris Middleton (36)
| Antetokounmpo, Monroe (10)
| Michael Carter-Williams (9)
| Chesapeake Energy Arena18,203
| 12–21
|-style="background:#bfb;"
| 34
| December 31
| @ Indiana
| 
| Khris Middleton (33)
| Michael Carter-Williams (7)
| Michael Carter-Williams (8)
| Bankers Life Fieldhouse16,348
| 13–21

|- style="background:#bfb;"
| 35
| January 2
| @ Minnesota
| 
| Greg Monroe (19)
| Greg Monroe (10)
| Michael Carter-Williams (6)
| Target Center14,107
| 14–21
|-style="background:#fbb;"
| 36
| January 4
| San Antonio
| 
| Khris Middleton (19)
| Monroe, Parker (8)
| Michael Carter-Williams (6)
| BMO Harris Bradley Center18,418
| 14–22
|-style="background:#fbb;"
| 37
| January 5
| @ Chicago
| 
| Khris Middleton (26)
| Greg Monroe (12)
| Michael Carter-Williams (12)
| United Center21,686
| 14–23
|-style="background:#bfb;"
| 38
| January 8
| Dallas
| 
| Khris Middleton (27)
| Monroe, Carter-Williams (12)
| Michael Carter-Williams (12)
| BMO Harris Bradley Center16,409
| 15–23
|-style="background:#fbb;"
| 39
| January 10
| @ New York
| 
| Greg Monroe (28)
| Antetokounmpo, Monroe (10)
| Michael Carter-Williams (6)
| Madison Square Garden19,812
| 15–24
|-style="background:#bfb;"
| 40
| January 12
| Chicago
| 
| Greg Monroe (28)
| Antetokounmpo, Monroe (10)
| Michael Carter-Williams (6)
| BMO Harris Bradley Center16,867
| 16–24
|-style="background:#fbb;"
| 41
| January 13
| @ Washington
| 
| Khris Middleton (25)
| Greg Monroe (12)
| Antetokounmpo, Carter-Williams (6)
| Verizon Center16,248
| 16–25
|-style="background:#bfb;"
| 42
| January 15
| Atlanta
| 
| Giannis Antetokounmpo (28)
| Giannis Antetokounmpo (16)
| Michael Carter-Williams (7)
| BMO Harris Bradley Center15,144
| 17–25
|-style="background:#bfb;"
| 43
| January 16
| @ Charlotte
| 
| Khris Middleton (24)
| Giannis Antetokounmpo (11)
| Jerryd Bayless (6)
| Time Warner Cable Arena18,288
| 18–25
|-style="background:#bfb;"
| 44
| January 19
| @ Miami
| 
| Khris Middleton (22)
| Greg Monroe (10)
| Khris Middleton (7)
| American Airlines Arena19,886
| 19–25
|- style="background:#fbb;"
| 45
| January 22
| @ Houston
| 
| Middleton, Monroe (21)
| Michael Carter-Williams (12)
| Khris Middleton (7)
| Toyota Center17,196
| 19–26
|-style="background:#fbb;"
| 46
| January 23
| @ New Orleans
| 
| Middleton, Monroe (22)
| Greg Monroe (11)
| Middleton, Carter-Williams (5)
| Smoothie King Center16,980
| 19–27
|-style="background:#bfb;"
| 47
| January 26
| Orlando
| 
| Antetokounmpo, Middleton (25)
| Greg Monroe (11)
| Khris Middleton (7)
| BMO Harris Bradley Center11,884
| 20–27
|-style="background:#fbb;"
| 48
| January 28
| @ Memphis
| 
| Greg Monroe (21)
| Jabari Parker (8)
| Khris Middleton (6)
| FedExForum15,244
| 20–28
|-style="background:#fbb;"
| 49
| January 29
| Miami
| 
| Giannis Antetokounmpo (28)
| Michael Carter-Williams (8)
| Antetokounmpo, Carter-Williams (6)
| BMO Harris Bradley Center17,846
| 20–29

|-style="background:#fbb;"
| 50
| February 1
| @ Sacramento
| 
| Greg Monroe (24)
| Greg Monroe (12)
| Michael Carter-Williams (13)
| Sleep Train Arena16,827
| 20–30
|- style="background:#fbb;"
| 51
| February 2
| @ Portland
| 
| Khris Middleton (21)
| Antetokounmpo, Middleton, Monroe (8)
| Antetokounmpo, Bayless (5)
| Moda Center18,306
| 20–31
|- style="background:#fbb;"
| 52
| February 5
| @ Utah
| 
| Khris Middleton (18)
| Greg Monroe (9)
| Michael Carter-Williams (4)
| Vivint Smart Home Arena19,911
| 20–32
|- style="background:#bfb;"
| 53
| February 9
| Boston
| 
| Greg Monroe (29)
| Greg Monroe (12)
| O. J. Mayo (6)
| BMO Harris Bradley Center13,215
| 21–32
|- style="background:#bfb;"
| 54
| February 11
| Washington
| 
| Khris Middleton (26)
| Giannis Antetokounmpo (13)
| Khris Middleton (9)
| BMO Harris Bradley Center14,172
| 22–32
|- align="center"
|colspan="9" bgcolor="#bbcaff"|All-Star Break
|-style="background:#fbb;"
| 55
| February 19
| Charlotte
| 
| Jabari Parker (23)
| Giannis Antetokounmpo (11)
| Khris Middleton (7)
| BMO Harris Bradley Center16,370
| 22–33
|- style="background:#bfb;"
| 56
| February 20
| @ Atlanta
| 
| Jabari Parker (28)
| Jabari Parker (13)
| O. J. Mayo (6)
| Philips Arena18,653
| 23–33
|- style="background:#bfb;"
| 57
| February 22
| L. A. Lakers
| 
| Giannis Antetokounmpo (27)
| Giannis Antetokounmpo (10)
| Giannis Antetokounmpo (12)
| BMO Harris Bradley Center18,717
| 24–33
|- style="background:#fbb;"
| 58
| February 25
| @ Boston
| 
| Jabari Parker (22)
| Greg Monroe (8)
| Giannis Antetokounmpo (8)
| TD Garden18,157
| 24–34
|- style="background:#fbb;"
| 59
| February 27
| Detroit
| 
| Khris Middleton (26)
| Giannis Antetokounmpo (12)
| Giannis Antetokounmpo (7)
| BMO Harris Bradley Center17,165
| 24–35
|- style="background:#bfb;"
| 60
| February 29
| Houston
| 
| Jabari Parker (36)
| Giannis Antetokounmpo (17)
| Giannis Antetokounmpo (11)
| BMO Harris Bradley Center13,214
| 25–35

|- style="background:#fbb;"
| 61
| March 2
| Indiana
| 
| Khris Middleton (23)
| Greg Monroe (7)
| Jerryd Bayless (5)
| BMO Harris Bradley Center14,263
| 25–36
|- style="background:#bfb;"
| 62
| March 4
| Minnesota
| 
| Khris Middleton (32)
| Giannis Antetokounmpo (9)
| Giannis Antetokounmpo (12)
| BMO Harris Bradley Center16,366
| 26–36
|- style="background:#fbb;"
| 63
| March 6
| Oklahoma City
| 
| Antetokounmpo, Parker (26)
| Giannis Antetokounmpo (12)
| Giannis Antetokounmpo (10)
| BMO Harris Bradley Center16,565
| 26–37
|- style="background:#fbb;"
| 64
| March 7
| @ Chicago
| 
| Jerryd Bayless (20)
| Jabari Parker (11)
| Giannis Antetokounmpo (10)
| United Center21,672
| 26–38
|- style="background:#bfb;"
| 65
| March 9
| Miami
| 
| Giannis Antetokounmpo (24)
| Greg Monroe (8)
| Khris Middleton (8)
| BMO Harris Bradley Center15,005
| 27–38
|- style="background:#bfb;"
| 66
| March 12
| New Orleans
| 
| Khris Middleton (19)
| Greg Monroe (11)
| Khris Middleton (8)
| BMO Harris Bradley Center16,518
| 28–38
|- style="background:#bfb;"
| 67
| March 13
| @ Brooklyn
| 
| Giannis Antetokounmpo (28)
| Giannis Antetokounmpo (11)
| Giannis Antetokounmpo (14)
| Barclays Center15,241
| 29–38
|- style="background:#fbb;"
| 68
| March 15
| Toronto
| 
| Antetokounmpo, Parker (18)
| Giannis Antetokounmpo (12)
| Giannis Antetokounmpo (9)
| BMO Harris Bradley Center13,522
| 29–39
|- style="background:#bfb;"
| 69
| March 17
| Memphis
| 
| Giannis Antetokounmpo (15)
| Greg Monroe (10)
| Giannis Antetokounmpo (11)
| BMO Harris Bradley Center11,740
| 30–39
|- style="background:#fbb;"
| 70
| March 20
| Utah
| 
| Jabari Parker (19)
| Jabari Parker (8)
| Giannis Antetokounmpo (7)
| BMO Harris Bradley Center14,124
| 30–40
|- style="background:#fbb;"
| 71
| March 21
| @ Detroit
| 
| Khris Middleton (27)
| Giannis Antetokounmpo (12)
| Jerryd Bayless (6)
| The Palace of Auburn Hills13,577
| 30–41
|- style="background:#fbb;"
| 72
| March 23
| @ Cleveland
| 
| Giannis Antetokounmpo (24)
| Giannis Antetokounmpo (6)
| Khris Middleton (11)
| Quicken Loans Arena20,562
| 30–42
|- style="background:#fbb;"
| 73
| March 25
| @ Atlanta
| 
| Jabari Parker (19)
| John Henson (10)
| Giannis Antetokounmpo (4)
| Philips Arena17,070
| 30–43
|-style="background:#fbb;"
| 74
| March 26
| Charlotte
| 
| John Henson (19)
| John Henson (8)
| Tyler Ennis (12)
| BMO Harris Bradley Center15,544
| 30–44
|-style="background:#bfb;"
| 75
| March 30
| Phoenix
| 
| Khris Middleton (26)
| Khris Middleton (7)
| Giannis Antetokounmpo (6)
| BMO Harris Bradley Center15,733
| 31–44

|-style="background:#bfb;"
| 76
| April 1
| Orlando
| 
| Jabari Parker (26)
| Giannis Antetokounmpo (11)
| Giannis Antetokounmpo (11)
| BMO Harris Bradley Center16,268
| 32–44
|-style="background:#fbb;"
| 77
| April 3
| Chicago
| 
| Giannis Antetokounmpo (34)
| Jabari Parker (11)
| Giannis Antetokounmpo (9)
| BMO Harris Bradley Center15,768
| 32–45
|-style="background:#fbb;"
| 78
| April 5
| Cleveland
| 
| Giannis Antetokounmpo (22)
| Giannis Antetokounmpo (14)
| Giannis Antetokounmpo (8)
| BMO Harris Bradley Center15,061
| 32–46
|-style="background:#fbb;"
| 79
| April 8
| @ Boston
| 
| Giannis Antetokounmpo (27)
| Greg Monroe (8)
| Tyler Ennis (11)
| TD Garden18,624
| 32–47
|-style="background:#bfb;"
| 80
| April 10
| @ Philadelphia
| 
| Khris Middleton (36)
| John Henson (10)
| Khris Middleton (9)
| Wells Fargo Center16,267
| 33–47
|-style="background:#fbb;"
| 81
| April 11
| @ Orlando
| 
| Greg Monroe (23)
| Miles Plumlee (13)
| Khris Middleton (7)
| Amway Center18,374
| 33–48
|-style="background:#fbb;"
| 82
| April 13
| Indiana
| 
| Giannis Antetokounmpo (19)
| Giannis Antetokounmpo (9)
| Giannis Antetokounmpo (5)
| BMO Harris Bradley Center16,569
| 33–49

Transactions

Overview

Trades

Free agents

References

Milwaukee Bucks seasons
Milwaukee Bucks
Milwaukee Bucks
Milwaukee Bucks